James "Jimmy" Camazzola (born January 5, 1964 in Vancouver, British Columbia) is a retired professional ice hockey forward. His older brother, Tony Camazzola, also played in the NHL with the Washington Capitals.

Playing career
His only NHL appearances were three games with the Chicago Blackhawks in 1983-84 and 1987. He played three seasons in North America before playing several more in the top leagues of Germany and Italy. He was also the Coach from Associazione Sportiva Asiago Hockey.

Camazzola has represented Italy internationally at the 1992 and 1994 Winter Olympics.

Camazzola is currently an assistant hockey coach at Simon Fraser University. In 2018, Camazzola was named the first head coach of the  Vancouver NE Chiefs.

Career statistics

References

External links

1964 births
Augsburger Panther players
Bolzano HC players
Canadian ice hockey forwards
Canadian sportspeople of Italian descent
Chicago Blackhawks draft picks
Chicago Blackhawks players
Courmaosta HC players
Asiago Hockey 1935 players
HC Varese players
Ice hockey players at the 1992 Winter Olympics
Ice hockey players at the 1994 Winter Olympics
Italian ice hockey players
Kamloops Junior Oilers players
Living people
Maine Mariners players
New Westminster Bruins players
Nova Scotia Oilers players
Olympic ice hockey players of Italy
Penticton Knights players
Saginaw Generals players
Seattle Breakers players
Ice hockey people from Vancouver
Canadian expatriate ice hockey players in Italy
Canadian expatriate ice hockey players in Germany